The Northcote Farm School (NFS) (also known as the Lady Northcote Farm School) was a farm school built at Glenmore, near Bacchus Marsh, Victoria, in 1937.

It was constructed for the education of child migrants, of whom it received 273 from 1937 to the 1970s; it was closed from 1944 to 1948 due to the decline in child migrants during World War II. It was shut down in the late 1970s due to the redistribution of funds, and now operates as a school camp.

NFS is listed on the Victorian Heritage Register, as having "historical, architectural and social significance to the State of Victoria".

References

External links
National Australian Archives research guide on NFS
ABC Ballarat report on restoration of NFS cottage
Victorian Government guide on NFS

Bacchus Marsh
1937 establishments in Australia
Educational institutions established in 1937
Educational institutions disestablished in 1979
History of immigration to Australia
Defunct schools in Victoria (Australia)